The 2017–18 Biathlon World Cup – Stage 3 was the 3rd event of the season and was held in Annecy, France, from 15 December until 17 December 2017.

Schedule of events

Medal winners

Men

Women

References 

Biathlon World Cup - Stage 3, 2017-18
2017–18 Biathlon World Cup
Biathlon World Cup - Stage 3
Biathlon competitions in France
Sport in Annecy